David Maimon (February 15, 1929 – May 14, 2010) was an Israeli general of Yemenite origin. He held various posts including military governor of the Gaza Strip, head of the Israel Prison Service and president of the Military Court of Appeals.

References

1929 births
2010 deaths
Israeli generals
Israeli people of Yemeni-Jewish descent
Yemenite Jews